Eccymatoge fulvida is a moth of the family Geometridae first described by Alfred Jefferis Turner in 1907. It is known from Australia.

References

Larentiinae